Fairy Gone is a Japanese anime television series produced by P.A. Works and was announced on January 24, 2019. It premiered on April 7, 2019 on Tokyo MX, BS11, MBS, and AT-X. The series is directed by Kenichi Suzuki and written by Ao Jūmonji, with Haruhisa Nakata and Takako Shimizu handling character designs. Japanese musician Know-Name (stylized as [K]NoW_NAME) is composing the music and performed the series' opening theme song "Knock On the Core", as well as the second opening theme song "Still Standing". Funimation has licensed the series; the English dub premiered on April 28, 2019. The series was listed for 24 episodes, but it was announced that the series will be split-cour, with the second half airing from October 6 to December 22, 2019.


Episode list

References

Fairy Gone